Chenaqchi-ye Olya (also Romanized as Chenāqchī-ye ‘Olyā and Chonāqchī-ye ‘Olyā; also known as Chenāqchī-ye Bālā, Chunāqcheh ‘Uliya, and Janāqchī-ye Bālā) is a village in Duzaj Rural District, Kharqan District, Zarandieh County, Markazi Province, Iran. At the 2006 census, its population was 262, in 74 families.

The historical antiquity of the village of Upper Chanaghchi refers to the Safavid period.

References 

 chenaqchiye-olya Travel To Iran - 2020 

Populated places in Zarandieh County